Lunenburg is a provincial electoral district in Nova Scotia, Canada, that elects one member of the Nova Scotia House of Assembly.

From 1867 to 1956, the district included all of Lunenburg County. In 1956, the district was abolished into Lunenburg Centre, Lunenburg East and Lunenburg West. The riding was re-created in 1993 with nearly identical boundaries to Lunenburg Centre, except it lost the area west of the LaHave River (except New Germany) to Lunenburg West. The district also lost the Tancook Islands to Chester-St. Margaret's.

The riding includes the towns of Lunenburg and Mahone Bay.

Geography

Members of the Legislative Assembly
This riding has elected the following Members of the Legislative Assembly:

Election results

1956 general election

1960 general election

1963 general election

1967 general election

1970 general election

1974 general election

1978 general election

1981 general election

1984 general election

1988 general election

1993 general election

1998 general election

1999 general election

2003 general election

2006 general election

2009 general election

2013 general election

|-

|Liberal
|Suzanne Lohnes-Croft
|align="right"|3,182
|align="right"|37.81
|align="right"|
|-

|New Democratic Party
|Pam Birdsall
|align="right"|2,768
|align="right"|32.89
|align="right"|
|-

|Progressive Conservative
|Brian Pickings
|align="right"|2,465
|align="right"|29.29
|align="right"|
|}

2017 general election

2021 general election

References

External links
CBC riding profile

Nova Scotia provincial electoral districts